Pennsylvania Route 284 (PA 284) is a  state highway located in Lycoming County in Pennsylvania.  The western terminus is at PA 287 in  English Center and the eastern terminus is at an interchange with U.S. Route 15 (US 15) in the Buttonwood section of McNett Township. PA 284 was designated as a spur of PA 84 in the 1928 renumbering of state highways in Pennsylvania. The route was paved in 1932 and has remained relatively untouched since, although PA 84 was re-designated as PA 287 in 1961 to avoid duplication with Interstate 84 (I-84).

Route description

PA 284 begins at an intersection with PA 287 just north of the village of English Center. The road winds northeast through rural Lycoming County alongside nearby Little Pine Creek. PA 284 runs through Pine Township, soon reaching the newly named Blockhouse Creek (from Little Pine). The two-lane continues through the dense woods in the area, paralleling Blockhouse Creek into the village of Buttonwood. In Buttonwood, PA 284 enters an interchange with US 15, first intersecting with the ramp to US 15 south. After crossing the freeway, PA 284 curves north and ends at the junction with an on-ramp to US 15 northbound.

History
A road in the location of PA 284 first shows on maps as early as 1873. PA 284 was first designated along its current alignment during the 1928 renumbering of state highways in Pennsylvania. The designation was done as a spur to the alignment of PA 84, which was designated from Piatt Township to the New York state line. The entire alignment of PA 284 was paved by the Pennsylvania Department of Highways in 1932, including the bridge over Flooks Run and Blacks Creek. However, the alignment has remained relatively unchanged since. In 1961, with the designation of I-84, the alignment of PA 84 was re-designated as PA 287 to avoid duplication.
In 1974, PA 284 was adjusted for the construction of the new US 15 alignment. This was adjusted in 1998 with the construction of US 15 for preparations to convert the route to I-99.

Major intersections

See also

References

External links

Pennsylvania Highways: PA 284

284
Transportation in Lycoming County, Pennsylvania